...And See That's the Thing (stylized as #AndSeeThatsTheThing) is the first extended play by American hip hop recording artist Dej Loaf. It was released exclusively to digital media outlets on July 31, 2015 by Columbia Records.

Critical reception

The album has received good reviews with Sidney Madden of XXL Magazine saying she shows growth and versatility on the album. Robert Christgau from Vice gave the record a "B+", writing that it "begins with three rather joyful tracks—electric-celeste grindin' pledge 'Desire' to burbling-synth grindin' saga 'Been on My Grind' to—finally, some fun—Big Sean transactional-sex deal 'Back Up.' Then that killjoy Future starts nosing around, and I mean literally, in her pussy, which is as joyful as that one gets. And then comes two pieces of theoretical product".

Track listing

Charts

Release history

References 

2015 EPs
Dej Loaf albums
Columbia Records EPs